The Angel of Terror is a 1922 crime novel by the British writer Edgar Wallace.

Adaptation
In 1963 it was turned into the film Ricochet directed by John Moxey as part of a long-running series of Wallace films made at Merton Park Studios.

References

Bibliography
 Goble, Alan. The Complete Index to Literary Sources in Film. Walter de Gruyter, 1999.

1922 British novels
Novels by Edgar Wallace
British crime novels
British novels adapted into films